Willem Marcel (Wim) De Craene (30 July 1950 – 14 September 1990) was a Flemish Belgian singer. His most famous songs were 'Rozane' (1975), 'Tim' (1975) and 'Breek uit jezelf' (1988).

Career

At the age of 18 he went to Amsterdam because his mentor Ramses Shaffy lived there at the time.

1975 was his most popular year as an artist.

In 1990 De Craene committed suicide. He took an overdose of medication.

Discography

Albums
 Wim De Craene (1973)
 Alles is nog bij het oude (1975)
 Brussel (1975)
 Rozerood-oranje (1975)
 Wim De Craene is ook nooit weg (1977)
 Perte Totale (1980)
 Kraaknet (1983)
 Via Dolorosa (1988)

Singles
 Recht naar de kroegen en de wijven (1970)
 Portret van gisteren (1970)
 De Kleine Man (1974), an updated cover of Louis Davids' hit of 1929.
 Tim (1975)
 Rozane (1975)
 Marcellino (1976)
 Help ik win een miljoen (1978)
 St. Tropez (1980)
 Ravage (1980)
 Hoor (1982)
 Ik kan geen kikker van de kant afduwen (1982)
 Het exuberante leven van Leentje De Vries (1982)
 Kristien (1983)
 Rikky (1983)
 Laat me met je meegaan (1983)
 Breek uit jezelf (1987)
 Vrijwillig (1988)
 Leen (1990)
 Enkel in een broekje (1990)

External links
 

20th-century Belgian male singers
20th-century Belgian singers
1990 deaths
1950 births
1990 suicides
Drug-related suicides in Belgium